The Church of Santa Maria di Montedoro (anciently called Monte Moro) is a religious building in Montefiascone, central Italy, located at the foot of a hill, three kilometres from the city, on the Strada Verentana.

History
Its plan was started by Antonio da Sangallo the Younger while he was busy in the restoration of the Palazzo Papale in Montefiascone, commissioned by Pope Leo X.
The project of this church saw initially economical impediments because of a severe plague in 1523, and was later completed by  architect Pietro Tartarino.

Description
It is an octagonal temple, joined to a semi-circular choir, 21 meters long. In the middle of each side there are windows, some of which are closed. Above the windows  is the tholobate; above it tholobate rises a rough wall that hides the small dome erected on the same tholobate.

The church can be accessed through two doors: the interior houses there are five chapels and the large semicircular chapel of the altar. The chapels have frescoes depicting the Crucifixion of Jesus, the Resurrection and the  Madonna with Child.

Maria di Montedoro
Octagonal churches in Italy
Renaissance architecture in Lazio
16th-century Roman Catholic church buildings in Italy